The 2015 Wake Forest Demon Deacons baseball team will represent Wake Forest University during the 2015 NCAA Division I baseball season. The Demon Deacons will play their home games at Gene Hooks Field at Wake Forest Baseball Park as a member of the Atlantic Coast Conference. They will be led by head coach Tom Walter, in his sixth season at Wake Forest.

Previous season
In 2014, the Demon Deacons finished the season 4th in the ACC's Atlantic Division with a record of 30–26, 15–15 in conference play. They qualified for the 2014 Atlantic Coast Conference baseball tournament, and were eliminated in the play-in round. They failed to qualify for the 2014 NCAA Division I baseball tournament.

Personnel

Roster

Coaching staff

Schedule

! style="background:#000000;color:white;"| Regular Season
|- valign="top" 

|- align="center" bgcolor=""
| 1 || February 13 ||  ||  || Wake Forest Baseball Park • Winston-Salem, NC ||  |  ||  ||  ||  ||  ||
|- align="center" bgcolor=""
| 2 || February 14 || Delaware ||  || Wake Forest Baseball Park • Winston-Salem, NC ||  ||  ||  ||  ||  ||  ||
|- align="center" bgcolor=""
| 3 || February 15 ||  ||  || Wake Forest Baseball Park • Winston-Salem, NC ||  ||  ||  ||  ||  ||  ||
|- align="center" bgcolor=""
| 4 || February 15 || VCU ||  || Wake Forest Baseball Park • Winston-Salem, NC ||  ||  ||  ||  ||  ||  ||
|- align="center" bgcolor=""
| 5 || February 17 || at  ||  || T. Henry Wilson, Jr. Field • Davidson, NC ||  ||  ||  ||  ||  ||  ||
|- align="center" bgcolor=""
| 6 || February 20 || vs.  ||  || Brooks Field • Wilmington, NC ||  ||  ||  ||  ||  ||  ||
|- align="center" bgcolor=""
| 7 || February 21 || vs.  ||  || Brooks Field • Wilmington, NC ||  ||  ||  ||  ||  ||  ||
|- align="center" bgcolor=""
| 8 || February 22 || at  ||  || Brooks Field • Wilmington, NC ||  ||  ||  ||  ||  ||  ||
|- align="center" bgcolor=""
| 9 || February 24 ||  ||  || Wake Forest Baseball Park • Winston-Salem, NC ||  ||  ||  ||  ||  ||  ||
|- align="center" bgcolor=""
| 10 || February 27 ||  ||  || Wake Forest Baseball Park • Winston-Salem, NC ||  ||  ||  ||  ||  ||  ||
|- align="center" bgcolor=""
| 11 || February 28 ||  ||  || Wake Forest Baseball Park • Winston-Salem, NC ||  ||  ||  ||  ||  ||  ||
|-

|- align="center" bgcolor=""
| 12 || March 1 || Towson ||  || Wake Forest Baseball Park • Winston-Salem, NC ||  ||  ||  ||  ||  ||  ||
|- align="center" bgcolor=""
| 13 || March 1 || Marshall ||  || Wake Forest Baseball Park • Winston-Salem, NC ||  ||  ||  ||  ||  ||  ||
|- align="center" bgcolor=""
| 13 || March 3 || at  ||  || UNCG Baseball Stadium • Greensboro, NC ||  ||  ||  ||  ||  ||  ||
|- align="center" bgcolor=""
| 14 || March 6 || Virginia Tech ||  || Wake Forest Baseball Park • Winston-Salem, NC ||  ||  ||  ||  ||  ||  ||
|- align="center" bgcolor=""
| 15 || March 7 || Virginia Tech ||  || Wake Forest Baseball Park • Winston-Salem, NC ||  ||  ||  ||  ||  ||  ||
|- align="center" bgcolor=""
| 16 || March 8 || Virginia Tech ||  || Wake Forest Baseball Park • Winston-Salem, NC ||  ||  ||  ||  ||  ||  ||
|- align="center" bgcolor=""
| 17 || March 10 || at  ||  || Walter C. Latham Park • Elon, NC ||  ||  ||  ||  ||  ||  ||
|- align="center" bgcolor=""
| 18 || March 11 || Elon ||  || Wake Forest Baseball Park • Winston-Salem, NC ||  ||  ||  ||  ||  ||  ||
|- align="center" bgcolor=""
| 19 || March 13 || at Florida State ||  || Dick Howser Stadium • Tallahassee, FL ||  ||  ||  ||  ||  ||  ||
|- align="center" bgcolor=""
| 21 || March 14 || at Florida State ||  || Dick Howser Stadium • Tallahassee, FL ||  ||  ||  ||  ||  ||  ||
|- align="center" bgcolor=""
| 22 || March 15 || at Florida State ||  || Dick Howser Stadium • Tallahassee, FL ||  ||  ||  ||  ||  ||  ||
|- align="center" bgcolor=""
| 23 || March 17 || Connecticut ||  || Wake Forest Baseball Park • Winston-Salem, NC ||  ||  ||  ||  ||  ||  ||
|- align="center" bgcolor=""
| 24 || March 20 || Miami (FL) ||  || Wake Forest Baseball Park • Winston-Salem, NC ||  ||  ||  ||  ||  ||  ||
|- align="center" bgcolor=""
| 25 || March 21 || Miami (FL) ||  || Wake Forest Baseball Park • Winston-Salem, NC ||  ||  ||  ||  ||  ||  ||
|- align="center" bgcolor=""
| 26 || March 22 || Miami (FL) ||  || Wake Forest Baseball Park • Winston-Salem, NC ||  ||  ||  ||  ||  ||  ||
|- align="center" bgcolor=""
| 27 || March 24 || at Appalachian State ||  || Smith Stadium • Boone, NC ||  ||  ||  ||  ||  ||  ||
|- align="center" bgcolor=""
| 28 || March 25 ||  ||  || Wake Forest Baseball Park • Winston-Salem, NC ||  ||  ||  ||  ||  ||  ||
|- align="center" bgcolor=""
| 29 || March 27 || at Clemson ||  || Doug Kingsmore Stadium • Clemson, SC ||  ||  ||  ||  ||  ||  ||
|- align="center" bgcolor=""
| 30 || March 28 || at Clemson ||  || Doug Kingsmore Stadium • Clemson, SC ||  ||  ||  ||  ||  ||  ||
|- align="center" bgcolor=""
| 31 || March 29 || at Clemson ||  || Doug Kingsmore Stadium • Clemson, SC ||  ||  ||  ||  ||  ||  ||
|- align="center" bgcolor=""
| 32 || March 31 ||  ||  || Wake Forest Baseball Park • Winston-Salem, NC ||  ||  ||  ||  ||  ||  ||
|-

|- align="center" bgcolor=""
| 33 || April 3 || Boston College ||  || Wake Forest Baseball Park • Winston-Salem, NC ||  ||  ||  ||  ||  ||  ||
|- align="center" bgcolor=""
| 34 || April 4 || Boston College ||  || Wake Forest Baseball Park • Winston-Salem, NC ||  ||  ||  ||  ||  ||  ||
|- align="center" bgcolor=""
| 35 || April 5 || Boston College ||  || Wake Forest Baseball Park • Winston-Salem, NC ||  ||  ||  ||  ||  ||  ||
|- align="center" bgcolor=""
| 36 || April 7 || UNC Greensboro ||  || Wake Forest Baseball Park • Winston-Salem, NC ||  ||  ||  ||  ||  ||  ||
|- align="center" bgcolor=""
| 37 || April 10 || at Pittsburgh ||  || Charles L. Cost Field • Pittsburgh, PA ||  ||  ||  ||  ||  ||  ||
|- align="center" bgcolor=""
| 38 || April 11 || at Pittsburgh ||  || Charles L. Cost Field • Pittsburgh, PA ||  ||  ||  ||  ||  ||  ||
|- align="center" bgcolor=""
| 39 || April 12 || at Pittsburgh ||  || Charles L. Cost Field • Pittsburgh, PA ||  ||  ||  ||  ||  ||  ||
|- align="center" bgcolor=""
| 40 || April 14 || Davidson ||  || Wake Forest Baseball Park • Winston-Salem, NC ||  ||  ||  ||  ||  ||  ||
|- align="center" bgcolor=""
| 41 || April 17 || at Louisville ||  || Jim Patterson Stadium • Louisville, KY ||  ||  ||  ||  ||  ||  ||
|- align="center" bgcolor=""
| 42 || April 18 || at Louisville ||  || Jim Patterson Stadium • Louisville, KY ||  ||  ||  ||  ||  ||  ||
|- align="center" bgcolor=""
| 43 || April 19 || at Louisville ||  || Jim Patterson Stadium • Louisville, KY ||  ||  ||  ||  ||  ||  ||
|- align="center" bgcolor=""
| 44 || April 21 || at Charlotte ||  || Robert and Mariam Hayes Stadium • Charlotte, NC ||  ||  ||  ||  ||  ||  ||
|- align="center" bgcolor=""
| 45 || April 24 || Notre Dame ||  || Wake Forest Baseball Park • Winston-Salem, NC ||  ||  ||  ||  ||  ||  ||
|- align="center" bgcolor=""
| 46 || April 25 || Notre Dame ||  || Wake Forest Baseball Park • Winston-Salem, NC ||  ||  ||  ||  ||  ||  ||
|- align="center" bgcolor=""
| 47 || April 26 || Notre Dame ||  || Wake Forest Baseball Park • Winston-Salem, NC ||  ||  ||  ||  ||  ||  ||
|- align="center" bgcolor=""
| 48 || April 28 ||  ||  || Wake Forest Baseball Park • Winston-Salem, NC ||  ||  ||  ||  ||  ||  ||
|- align="center" bgcolor=""
| 49 || April 29 || at High Point ||  || Williard Stadium • High Point, NC ||  ||  ||  ||  ||  ||  ||
|-

|- align="center" bgcolor=""
| 50 || May 8 || NC State ||  || Wake Forest Baseball Park • Winston-Salem, NC ||  ||  ||  ||  ||  ||  ||
|- align="center" bgcolor=""
| 51 || May 9 || NC State ||  || Wake Forest Baseball Park • Winston-Salem, NC ||  ||  ||  ||  ||  ||  ||
|- align="center" bgcolor=""
| 52 || May 10 || NC State ||  || Wake Forest Baseball Park • Winston-Salem, NC ||  ||  ||  ||  ||  ||  ||
|- align="center" bgcolor=""
| 53 || May 12 || at Coastal Carolina ||  || Charles Watson Stadium • Conway, SC ||  ||  ||  ||  ||  ||  ||
|- align="center" bgcolor=""
| 54 || May 14 || at Duke ||  || Jack Coombs Field • Durham, NC ||  ||  ||  ||  ||  ||  ||
|- align="center" bgcolor=""
| 55 || May 15 || at Duke ||  || Jack Coombs Field • Durham, NC ||  ||  ||  ||  ||  ||  ||
|- align="center" bgcolor=""
| 56 || May 16 || at Duke ||  || Jack Coombs Field • Durham, NC ||  ||  ||  ||  ||  ||  ||
|-

|- 
! style="background:#000000;color:white;"| Post-Season
|-

|- align="center"
|  || May 19 || TBD || || Durham Bulls Athletic Park • Durham, NC ||  ||  ||  ||  ||  ||  || 
|-

|-
| style="font-size:88%"| All rankings from Collegiate Baseball.

References

Wake Forest Demon Deacons
Wake Forest Demon Deacons baseball seasons
2015 in sports in North Carolina